This article contains a list of Singaporean patriotic songs.

A patriotic song is one which inspires feelings of pride in one's country. The list has both traditional folk songs that have special meaning to Singaporeans, as well as modern songs composed specifically for national celebrations, particularly the National Day Parade held on 9 August each year, Singapore's National Day.

Generally speaking, there may be said to be two types of Singaporean patriotic songs. The first type are traditional folk songs that have, over time, come to have special meaning to Singaporeans. Many of these are in vernacular languages – Malay, Mandarin and Tamil, for instance. Examples of such songs include Malay song "Di Tanjung Katong", Mandarin song "Xin Yao", and Tamil song "Munnaeru Vaalibaa".

The second type are the comparatively modern songs, mostly in English, that were composed specifically for national events – particularly the National Day Parade held annually on 9 August – and for use in schools. Each year since 1985, the National Day Parade Executive Committee has designated one such song as a National Day Parade theme song. The song is usually broadcast on radio and television starting from a month before National Day, and is given prominence during the Parade itself. Examples of such songs include "Stand Up for Singapore" (1985), "Count On Me Singapore" (1986) and "One People, One Nation, One Singapore" (1990). In 1998, there were 2 National Day Parade theme songs, "Home" and "City For The World" and one of them was reused for National Day Parade in 2004. Then in 2007 they used  two National Day Parade theme songs, "There's No Place I'd Rather Be" and "Will You?". 
As for the National Day Ceremony song, My People My Home, it was conducted by Dr Lee Tzu Pheng, it came out in the late 1990s and was reused for National Day Parade 2012, together with Love at First Light which is sung by singer Olivia Ong.

In 1984, the National Arts Council inaugurated the Sing Singapore Festival, the aim of which was to discover and promote home-grown music and artistes. According to the Council, it also hoped to nurture a love for music and singing and cultivate a greater sense of togetherness amongst Singaporeans. The programme led to the creation of a number of new songs by Singaporean composers, some of which were selected for National Day celebrations. These included "Home" (1998) by Dick Lee, "Where I Belong" (2001) by Tanya Chua, and "A Place in My Heart" (2003) by Kevin Quah. Local singers such as Taufik Batisah, Kit Chan and Stefanie Sun have performed songs in the Sing Singapore collection.

Critical reception
While some of these modern made-to-order patriotic songs have become popular in the country, they have not received universal acclaim. They have been criticized as artificial and propagandistic, "National songs foisted on you from above" as opposed to "Singapore Songs arising from grassroots".

A minor controversy also erupted over "There's No Place I'd Rather Be" (2007). Some people queried why the song does not mention Singapore by name, while others commented that the song was "touching" and that they related to it immediately, and that "[t]he spirit of patriotism is woven so well in the song". One correspondent to the Straits Times asked: "How did such a dreadful song become the National Day song?", lambasting  the melody as "uninspiring" and the lyrics as "insipid" – "it is quite obvious what the brief to [the composer] was: Write a song to persuade Singaporeans who have sought greener pastures to come home." The song's composer Jimmy Ye defended it, saying, "There's no need for it to be so in-your-face just because it's a National Day song". He noted that he had submitted the first draft of the song to the National Day Parade song committee, which had returned it with several changes. There was no mention of why "Singapore" got left out: "I guess the committee wanted to have a soft-sell approach too".

Apart from "There's No Place I'd Rather Be", earlier songs like "Shine On Me" (2000), "Where I Belong" (2001), and "We Will Get There" (2002) also do not mention Singapore by name.

The National Anthem

National Day Theme Songs (by year)

Songs with English lyrics

Notes
The song highlighted in blue was designated as the "millennium song" by the National Arts Council.
The four songs highlighted in pink were designated as "national songs" by the National Arts Council.
Songs highlighted in red are National Day Parade theme songs.
Songs highlighted in yellow were designated as "community songs" by the National Arts Council.
The song highlighted in green is the winner of SG50: The Gift of Song.

Songs with Malay lyrics

Notes
Songs highlighted in yellow were designated as "community songs" by the National Arts Council.
Semoga Bahagia was designated as the official Children's Day song.

Songs with Mandarin lyrics

Songs with Tamil lyrics

Notes
Songs highlighted in yellow were designated as "community songs" by the National Arts Council.

See also
Music of Singapore – National Day songs
National Day Parade – Theme songs

Notes

Further reading

.
, 3 vols.
.
.
.

External links
www.sg music page
Sing Singapore

National symbols of Singapore
Patriotic songs
Singapore